In telecommunication, distortion-limited operation is the condition prevailing when distortion of a received signal, rather than its attenuated amplitude (or power), limits performance under stated operational conditions and limits.  

Note:  Distortion-limited operation is reached when the system distorts the shape of the waveform beyond specified limits. For linear systems, distortion-limited operation is equivalent to bandwidth-limited operation.

References

Telecommunications engineering